Ting Tong may refer to:

 Ting Tong Macadangdang, a character from the UK television series Little Britain
 Inner Ting Tong and Outer Ting Tong, near Budleigh Salterton in South East Devon, England; see

See also
 Ding Dong (disambiguation)
 Ting Ting, a name